J class or Class J may refer to:

Locomotives
 NZR J class (1874), steam locomotives operating in New Zealand from 1874 until 1935
 NZR J class (1939), steam locomotives operating in New Zealand from 1939
 WAGR J class, steam locomotives operating in Western Australia from the 1890s
 WAGR J class (diesel), diesel locomotives operating in Western Australia from the 1960s
 Victorian Railways J class (1954), branch line steam locomotives operating in Victoria, Australia from 1954 to 1972
 Norfolk and Western Railway class J (1879), steam locomotives operating in the United States from 1879 until 1900 
 Norfolk and Western Railway class J (1903), steam locomotives operating in the United States from 1903 until 1935
 Norfolk and Western Railway class J (1941), steam locomotives operating in the United States from 1950 until 1959

Watercraft
 , a racing yacht design constructed for the America's Cup competition between 1931 and 1937 
 , a class of British-built destroyers active from 1937 until 1949 
 , a class of British-built submarines operated by the Royal Navy and Royal Australian Navy between 1916 and 1930
 , an Italian World War II boat

Other uses
J-class blimp, 1920s airships
J-segment, a European vehicle size class
Class. J., the ISO 4 abbreviation for The Classical Journal.
A code used by many airlines for business class

See also
J type (disambiguation)